The New Hampshire Wildcats men's ice hockey team is a National Collegiate Athletic Association (NCAA) Division I college ice hockey program that represents the University of New Hampshire. The Wildcats are a member of Hockey East. They play at the Whittemore Center Arena in Durham, New Hampshire.

History

Early years
The first New Hampshire ice hockey team played in January 1925, winning its first two games in a contest held in Lewiston, Maine. A year later, under the stewardship of Ernest Christensen, UNH played its first home game at the UNH ice rink, an outdoor facility that was completely dependent on cold weather for its surface. The Wildcats would play a small number of games for their first 15 seasons, fluctuating between an undefeated season in 1927 and a winless campaign in 1932. Christensen retired in 1938 and the team eventually came under the tutelage of Anthony Dougal but his tenure was suspended in 1943 due to the outbreak of World War II. The team finally returned to the ice in January 1947 with Dougal remaining for one year before handing the program over to Joseph Petroski. Horace "Pepper" Martin took over after four rather poor seasons and New Hampshire's fortunes began to change. By the mid-1950s the Wildcats started to play more and win more games than they ever had before and in 1955 an artificial ice rink was constructed on campus to help the team play more than a handful of home games.

ECAC
In 1961 New Hampshire was one of 28 schools that were founding members of ECAC Hockey. Martin turned the team over to A. Barr Snively and plans were underway to replace the Harry C. Batchelder Rink with an indoor ice rink. In the offseason of 1964, two events happened that hampered the ice hockey program. First, in April, head coach Snively suffered a heart attack and tragically died. With the school searching for a replacement the ECAC announced that it was dividing itself into two separate tiers. 'Major' programs would continue on with ECAC Hockey but 'minor' schools would be forced to join the newly-formed ECAC 2. Because their indoor facility had not yet been completed New Hampshire was forced out of the top tier. Rube Bjorkman was eventually named as head coach and he led the team for four years. During his tenure, the indoor arena was completed and christened as the Snively Arena after his late predecessor and a year later the program was readmitted into the top echelon of college hockey.

It was Bjorkman's successor, Charlie Holt, who put New Hampshire on the college hockey map. In Holt's first season UNH played its first postseason game, earning Holt his first of three Spencer Penrose Awards. In his first five seasons, the Wildcats finished with a winning record and then won the ECAC regular season championship in his sixth year. The Wildcats made their first NCAA appearance in 1977 and captured their first Conference championship two years later, but no matter how good Holt's teams were national success continued to elude him. under Holt the Wildcats went 0–6 in the frozen four and 2–8 in the tournament overall. While the wins started to come few and far between in the mid-1980s Holt continued to helm the program as it left ECAC Hockey to form Hockey East with six other northeastern schools.

Bob Kullen
Holt stepped down in 1986 and was replaced by long-time assistant Bob Kullen. In his first year the team saw marginal improvement but that summer Kullen was diagnosed with a rare form of heart disease that necessitated a transplant and his missing an entire season to recuperate. Dave O'Connor served as the interim head coach for 1987–88 allowing Kullen to return in the fall of '88. In two years New Hampshire saw its wins total improve to 12 and then 17 but by 1990 Kullen started rejecting his new heart and was forced to resign. Another UNH assistant, Dick Umile, was named as his replacement and unfortunately, Kullen died in November 1990 at the age of 41. Hockey East swiftly renamed its coach of the year award in his honor while the team continued the upward swing he began, allowing Umile to be the first recipient of the rechristened award.

Umile years
In Umile second season New Hampshire made the NCAA tournament for the first time in almost a decade and retroactively finished first in the conference after Maine was forced to forfeit 13 games. The team continued to play well for several seasons but after a disappointing season in 1996, the team won its first Hockey East Championship and set a new program record with 28 wins. The following year the Wildcats made the Frozen Four for the first time in 16 years and then reached even higher in 1999. in the penultimate year of the millennium the Wildcats won 30 games for the first time, establishing a still-record of 31 victories (as of 2019), winning their second conference title (first outright) and were led by sophomore goaltender Ty Conklin and senior center Jason Krog, the latter won the NCAA scoring title by 16 points and captured the Hobey Baker Award (UNH's only recipient as of 2019). Despite losing in the Hockey East tournament finale The team received the #2 overall seed and a bye into the second round. The Wildcats defeated two Michigan schools to reach their first National Championship game where they would ultimately fall in overtime to conference rival Maine.

UNH would continue to be a power in Hockey East, winning back to back conference championships in 2002 and 2003 and reached their second NCAA title game in '03 where they lost to Minnesota, 5-1. UNH would make the NCAA tournament every year from 2002 through 2011 but the team could not make it out of the Regionals after 2003. Starting in 2012 the program began a slow decline, ending up dead-last in the conference in 2017–18. After that season Umile decided to retire, leaving the school as the all-time leader in just about every coaching category and recording the third most wins all-time for one school at the Division I level.

Umile's final act for the program was to name his successor, allowing 1999 alumnus Michael Souza to become the 14th head coach in program history.

Seasons

Head coaches
As of the completion of 2021–22 season

Statistical Leaders
Source:

Career points leaders

Career goaltending leaders

GP = Games played; Min = Minutes played; W = Wins; L = Losses; T = Ties; GA = Goals against; SO = Shutouts; SV% = Save percentage; GAA = Goals against average

minimum 30 games played

Statistics current through the start of the 2019–20 season.

Current roster
As of August 23, 2022.

Awards and honors

Hockey Hall of Fame
Source:

Rod Langway (2002)

United States Hockey Hall of Fame
Source:

Charlie Holt (1997)
Rod Langway (1999)

NCAA

Individual awards

Hobey Baker Award
Jason Krog: 1999

Spencer Penrose Award
Charlie Holt: 1969, 1974, 1979
Dick Umile: 1999

NCAA Scoring Champion
Louis Frigon: 1971
Jason Krog: 1999
Tyler Kelleher: 2017

All-American teams
AHCA First Team All-Americans

1960–61: Rod Blackburn, G
1972–73: Gordie Clark, F
1973–74: Cap Raeder, G; Gordie Clark, F
1975–76: Cliff Cox, F; Jamie Hislop, F
1976–77: Tim Burke, D; Bob Miller, F
1977–78: Ralph Cox, F
1978–79: Ralph Cox, F
1981–82: Andy Brickley, F
1997–98: Mark Mowers, F
1998–99: Jason Krog, F
2000–01: Ty Conklin, G
2001–02: Darren Haydar, F; Colin Hemingway, F
2003–04: Steve Saviano, F
2004–05: Sean Collins, F
2007–08: Kevin Regan, G; Mike Radja, F
2009–10: Bobby Butler, F
2010–11: Blake Kessel, D; Paul Thompson, F
2012–13: Trevor van Riemsdyk, F
2015–16: Andrew Poturalski, F

AHCA Second Team All-Americans

1990–91: Jeff Levy, G
1991–92: Domenic Amodeo, F
1996–97: Tim Murray, D; Jason Krog, F
1998-99: Jayme Filipowicz, D
1999–00: Ty Conklin, G
2002–03: Mike Ayers, G; Lanny Gare, F; Colin Hemingway, F
2004–05: Brian Yandle, D
2005–06: Brian Yandle, D
2006–07: Trevor Smith, D
2007–08: Brad Flaishans, D; Matt Fornataro, F
2009–10: Brian Foster, G; Blake Kessel, D
2016–17: Tyler Kelleher, F

ECAC Hockey

Individual awards

Player of the Year
Ralph Cox, C: 1979

Rookie of the Year
Bob Miller, F: 1975
Normand Lacombe, RW: 1982

Most Outstanding Player in Tournament
Greg Moffett, G: 1979

All-Conference teams
First Team All-ECAC Hockey

1971–72: Gordie Clark, F; Guy Smith, F
1972–73: Gordie Clark, F
1973–74: Gordie Clark, F
1974–75: Jamie Hislop, F
1975–76: Jamie Hislop, F
1976–77: Bob Miller, F
1977–78: Ralph Cox, F
1978–79: Ralph Cox, F
1981–82: Andy Brickley, F
1997–98: Mark Mowers, F
1998–99: Jason Krog, F
2000–01: Ty Conklin, G
2001–02: Darren Haydar, F; Colin Hemingway, F
2003–04: Steve Saviano, F
2004–05: Sean Collins, F
2007–08: Kevin Regan, G; Mike Radja, F
2009–10: Bobby Butler, F
2010–11: Blake Kessel, D; Paul Thompson, F
2012–13: Trevor van Riemsdyk, F
2015–16: Andrew Poturalski, F

Second Team All-ECAC Hockey

1968–69: Rick Metzer, G
1973–74: Cap Raeder, G
1975–76: Cliff Cox, F; Tim Burke, F
1976–77: Tim Burke, D
1978–79: Greg Moffett, G; Bob Gould, F
1982–83: Normand Lacombe, F
1983–84: Bruce Gillies, G; Brian Byrnes, D

Hockey East

Individual awards

Player of the Year
Jason Krog: 1999
Ty Conklin: 2000
Darren Haydar: 2002
Mike Ayers: 2003
Steve Saviano: 2004
Kevin Regan: 2008
Bobby Butler: 2010
Paul Thompson: 2011

Rookie of the Year
Jeff Levy: 1991
Mark Mowers: 1995
Darren Haydar: 1999
Sean Collins: 2002

Best Defensive Forward
John Sadowski: 2000
Preston Callander: 2005

Len Ceglarski Award
Joe Flanagan: 1992
Todd Hall: 1996
Steve Saviano: 2004
Jackson Pierson: 2022

Best Defensive Defenseman
Steve O'Brien: 1999
Joe Charlebois: 2008

Three-Stars Award
Colin Hemingway: 2002
Bobby Butler: 2010
Paul Thompson: 2011
John Henrion: 2013
Tyler Kelleher: 2017

Coach of the Year
Dick Umile: 1991, 1997, 1999, 2002, 2007, 2010

Tournament Most Valuable Player
Darren Haydar: 2002

All-Conference teams
First Team All-Hockey East

1994–95: Eric Flinton, F
1995–96: Todd Hall, D; Mark Mowers, F
1996–97: Tim Murray, D; Eric Boguniecki, F; Mark Mowers, F; Jason Krog, F
1997–98: Jason Krog, F
1998–99: Jayme Filipowicz, D; Jason Krog, F
1999–00: Ty Conklin, G
2000–01: Ty Conklin, G
2001–02: Darren Haydar, F; Colin Hemingway, F
2002–03: Mike Ayers, G; Lanny Gare, F
2003–04: Steve Saviano, F
2006–07: Trevor Smith, F
2007–08: Kevin Regan, G; Brad Flaishans, D; Mike Radja, F
2009–10: Brian Foster, G; Blake Kessel, D; Bobby Butler, F
2010–11: Blake Kessel, D; Paul Thompson, F
2012–13: Trevor van Riemsdyk, D
2015–16: Andrew Poturalski, F
2016–17: Tyler Kelleher, F

Second Team All-Hockey East

1990–91: Jeff Levy, G
1991–92: Scott Morrow, F
1992–93: Rob Donovan, F
1997–98: Derek Bekar, F; Mark Mowers, F
1998-99: Ty Conklin, G; Darren Haydar, F
1999–00: Michael Souza, F; Darren Haydar, F
2001–02: Mike Ayers, G; Garrett Stafford, D
2002–03: Colin Hemingway, F
2004–05: Brian Yandle, D; Sean Collins, F
2005–06: Brian Yandle, D; Daniel Winnik, F
2006–07: Chris Murray, D
2007–08: Craig Switzer, D; Matt Fornataro, F
2008–09: James van Riemsdyk, F
2013–14: Eric Knodel, D; Kevin Goumas, F
2016–17: Tyler Kelleher, F

Third Team All-Hockey East

Hockey East All-Rookie Team

1984–85: Stephen Leach, F
1987–88: Pat Morrison, G; Chris Winnes, F
1990–91: Jeff Levy, G
1993–94: Tim Murray, D; Eric Boguniecki, F
1994–95: Mark Mowers, F
1995–96: Derek Bekar, F
1996–97: Sean Matile, G; Michael Souza, F
1997–98: Matthias Trattnig, F
1998–99: Ty Conklin, G; Darren Haydar, F
2001–02: Sean Collins, F
2003–04: Brett Hemingway, F
2004–05: Kevin Regan, G
2007–08: James van Riemsdyk, F
2011–12: Casey DeSmith, G; Trevor van Riemsdyk, D
2016–17: Patrick Grasso, F

Program Records

Hockey East

Individual
Most Career Short-Handed Goals: Mark Mowers; 8
Longest Goalie Win Streak: Kevin Regan; 11

Olympians
This is a list of New Hampshire alumni were a part of an Olympic team.

New Hampshire Wildcats Hall of Fame
The following is a list of people associated with the New Hampshire men's ice hockey program who were elected into the New Hampshire Wildcats Hall of Fame (induction date in parenthesis).

Gordie Clark (1982)
Ernest Christensen (1982)
Rod Blackburn (1983)
Cliff Cox (1983)
Jamie Hislop (1983)
A. Barr Snively (1983)
Hank Swasey (1983)
Tim Burke (1984)
Louis Frigon (1985)
Russell Martin (1986)
Roger Magenau (1986)
Josiah Bartlett (1986)
Ralph Cox (1986)
Howard Hanley (1987)
Graham Bruder (1987)
John Gray (1987)
Bob Gould (1988)
William Weir (1989)
Cap Raeder (1989)
Charlie Holt (1989)
Mickey Goulet (1990)
Rod Langway (1990)
Albert Brodeur (1991)
J. Allan Clark (1991)
Edward Noel (1991)
Greg Moffett (1992)
Horace "Pepper" Martin (1993)
R. Braden Houston (1993)
Frank Roy (1993)
Dick Umile (1994)
Bob Miller (1994)
Donald Perkins (1995)
Michael Ontkean (1995)
Herbert Merrill (1996)
Raymond March Jr. (1996)
Guy Smith (1996)
Dave Lumley (1997)
Raymond Patten (1997)
Andy Brickley (1998)
Kenneth McKinnon (1999)
Bob Towse (2000)
Richard David (2000)
Kevin Dean (2000)
Bob Towse (2000)
Don Otis (2001)
Peter Van Buskirk (2001)
Paul Powers (2003)
Jason Krog (2005)
Mark Mowers (2006)
Ty Conklin (2008)
Dave O'Connor (2008)
Darren Haydar (2012)

Wildcats in the NHL
As of July 1, 2022.

WHA
Several players also were members of WHA teams.

Source:

See also
 New Hampshire Wildcats women's ice hockey
 New Hampshire Wildcats
 New Hampshire–Dartmouth rivalry
 New Hampshire–Maine hockey rivalry

References

External links
 New Hampshire Wildcats men's ice hockey

 
Ice hockey teams in New Hampshire